Petronella "Nel" Büch (6 December 1931, de Vos – 5 February 2013) was a Dutch sprinter. She competed at the 1952 Summer Olympics in the 100 m and 4 × 100 m relay and finished in sixth place in the relay. Between 1950 and 1954 she won five national titles in the 4 × 100 m relay with the team of her club Sagitta.

References

1931 births
2013 deaths
Athletes (track and field) at the 1952 Summer Olympics
Dutch female sprinters
Olympic athletes of the Netherlands
Athletes from Amsterdam
Olympic female sprinters